7 Women, also known as Seven Women, is a 1966 Metro-Goldwyn-Mayer Panavision drama film directed by John Ford and starring Anne Bancroft, Sue Lyon, Margaret Leighton, Flora Robson, Mildred Dunnock, Betty Field, Anna Lee, Eddie Albert, Mike Mazurki and Woody Strode. It was produced by Ford and Bernard Smith from a screenplay by Janet Green and John McCormick, based on the short story "Chinese Finale" by Norah Lofts. The musical score was conducted by Elmer Bernstein and the cinematography was handled by Joseph LaShelle. This was the last feature film directed by Ford, ending a career that had spanned 53 years.

Plot
In rural China in 1935, all but one of the white residents of a remote Christian mission post are women. The strict Miss Agatha Andrews is the head of the mission, assisted by the meek Miss Argent. Charles Pether is a mission teacher who always wanted to be a pastor; his peevish, panicky, self-centered and domineering middle-aged wife Florrie is pregnant for the first time. Emma Clark is the only young staff member and Miss Andrews treats her Emma as if she were her daughter.

The mission is elated to learn that a much-needed doctor is arriving, but they are shocked to discover that Dr. Cartwright is a Chicago woman who smokes, drinks alcohol, swears, wears pants, has short hair, disdains religion and sits before grace. Miss Andrews and Dr. Cartwright are soon at odds. Emma, who has led a very sheltered life, is fascinated by the newcomer, much to Miss Andrews' dismay.

After she has settled in, Dr. Cartwright urges Miss Andrews to provide money to send Florrie to a modern facility to birth her baby, as Florrie's advanced age places her at high risk, but Andrews refuses.

Meanwhile, rumors arise of atrocities committed by the militia of Mongolian warlord Tunga Khan. Miss Andrews is certain that the mission will be safe, as they are American citizens. After a nearby, even poorer British mission is sacked by Tunga Khan, Miss Andrews reluctantly accepts survivors Miss Binns, Mrs. Russell and Miss Ling, but only for a short time, as she is unwilling to harbor those of any other denomination for long.

Immediately after the arrival of the survivors, a cholera outbreak erupts. Dr. Cartwright quickly takes command, treating all the Chinese of the area. Miss Andrews' initial hostility to her subsides when Emma becomes sick and she implores Dr. Cartwright to save her life. After the emergency has subsided and Emma is well again, the relationship between Andrews and Cartwright begins to soften, but it deteriorates when Cartwright appears in the dining room drunk with a bottle of whiskey and tries to convince all of the pious women to drink as well.

One night, Charles and Cartwright see a fire on the horizon and hear gunfire. The next morning, the Chinese soldiers of the nearby garrison evacuate in a hurry, as Tunga Khan and his men are believed to be approaching. Miss Andrews is still convinced that the mission is untouchable, but Charles is now determined to be assertive. Kim, an English-speaking male Chinese mission staff member, and Charles drive out to investigate the situation, while urging everyone else to be prepared to leave the mission, despite Miss Andrews' opposition. After a while, they hear the car's horn, but once the gate is opened, bandits on horseback charge through, firing their guns, and quickly take command of the mission. Before being executed by the bandits, Kim tells the women that Charles was murdered when he tried to rescue a woman being raped by Tunga Khan's men. Then Miss Ling, coming from a powerful Mandarin family, is taken away to act as servant to Tunga Khan's young wife, while the seven white women are herded into a shed.

The women watch as Tunga Khan has every Chinese in the mission executed. Tunga Khan then comes into the shed and tries to take Emma. Realizing that they are mostly American women, he decides to ask for a ransom instead.

With Miss Andrews panicking and Florrie in labor, Dr. Cartwright asks for her desperately needed medical bag. Tunga Khan offers to exchange it for her sexual submission to him. The doctor agrees, and helps Florrie give birth to a baby boy. After Cartwright goes to fulfill her end of the bargain, an increasingly deranged Andrews vilifies her, repeatedly calling her "whore of Babylon." The others understand the sacrifice the doctor has made and why she has done so.

In the evening, the Mongols gather in a circle and take part in wrestling matches for entertainment. Dr. Cartwright watches the spectacle at Tunga Khan's side as his new concubine. When the lean warrior, who has been ogling Cartwright all evening, steps into the ring to face the winner of a bout, Tunga Khan insists on accepting the challenge himself and breaks the man's neck.

Cartwright convinces Tunga Khan to free the other women. Before Miss Argent leaves, she sees Dr. Cartwright hide a bottle that she had earlier called poison. She urges Cartwright not to do what she is planning, but to no avail. With the others safely away, Cartwright, now in a geisha outfit, goes to Tunga Khan's room and secretly poisons two drinks. She subserviently offers a cup to Tunga Khan as she utters, "So long, ya bastard." After Tunga Khan drinks, he immediately falls dead. After a moment's hesitation, Cartwright drinks from the second cup.

Cast
 Anne Bancroft as Dr. D. R. Cartwright
 Sue Lyon as Emma Clark, Mission Staff
 Margaret Leighton as Agatha Andrews, Head of Mission
 Flora Robson as Miss Binns, Head of British Mission
 Mildred Dunnock as Jane Argent, Andrews' Assistant
 Betty Field as Mrs. Florrie Pether, Charles' pregnant wife
 Anna Lee as Mrs. Russell, Mission Staff
 Eddie Albert as Charles Pether, Mission Teacher
 Mike Mazurki as Tunga Khan, Bandit Leader
 Woody Strode as Lean Warrior
 Jane Chang as Miss Ling, Mission Staff
 Hans William Lee as Kim, Mission Staff
 H.W. Gim as Coolie
 Irene Tsu as Chinese Girl

Accolades
The film has appeared in numerous lists:
 Most Misappreciated American Films of All Time (1977, Andrew Sarris)
 Most Misappreciated American Films of All Time (1977, Pascal Bonitzer)
 Most Misappreciated American Films of All Time (1977, Serge Daney)
 Most Important American Films (1977, Enno Patalas)
 Most Important American Films (1977, Luc Moullet)
 Genre Favorites: Adventure (1993)
 Alternative Choices to Sight and Sound's 360 Films Classics List (1998)
 100 Essential Films (2003–present, Slant Magazine)
 Favorite Films (1975, Syndicat Francais de la Critique de Cinema)

Cahiers du cinéma voted the film the sixth-best of 1966 and Andrew Sarris rated it the third-best of the year (behind Blow-up and Gertrud).

The film is currently ranked number 784 on the They Shoot Pictures, Don't They? list of the 1,000 greatest films of all time. The list is based on a poll of 1,825 film critics, scholars and cinephiles, as well as a culling of over 900 existing "greatest film" lists.

Production
The original story, "Chinese Finale," was presented as an episode of Alcoa Theatre in March 1960 with Hilda Plowright as Miss Andrews and Jan Sterling as Dr. Mary Cartwright.

John Ford considered both Katharine Hepburn and Jennifer Jones for the role of Dr. Cartwright, and Rosalind Russell lobbied for the part, but eventually Patricia Neal was cast. Ford began the film on February 8, 1965, on the MGM backlot, but Neal suffered a stroke after three days of filming. Anne Bancroft took the role of Dr. Cartwright, but Ford was unhappy with her and called her "the mistress of monotone." Ford originally considered Carol Lynley for the role of Emma Clark but MGM insisted on contract star Sue Lyon. Shooting finished on April 12, six days behind schedule.

To edit the film, Ford chose Otho Lovering, with whom he had worked on Stagecoach (1939). Lovering edited most of Ford's feature films in the 1960s.

The film was not released until 1966.

See also
 List of American films of 1966

References

External links
 
 
 
 

1966 films
1966 drama films
1960s English-language films
1960s Mandarin-language films
American drama films
Films scored by Elmer Bernstein
Films directed by John Ford
Films based on short fiction
Metro-Goldwyn-Mayer films
Films set in 1935
Films set in China
1960s American films